The Copenhagen Institute of Interaction Design (CIID) is a postgraduate school and consultancy based in Copenhagen, Denmark and San Jose, Costa Rica, which focuses on the domain of interaction design.

History 
The Copenhagen Institute of Interaction Design was launched in 2007 and in 2008, completed its Pilot Year programme in an attempt to establish a full-time Masters course in the field. The Pilot Year was awarded financial funding by The Enterprise and Construction Authority (EBST), the Danish Ministry of Culture, Novo Nordisk and the JL Foundation.

Description 
The Copenhagen Institute of Interaction Design is based in the center of Copenhagen. The school and its postgraduate Interaction Design Programme are in collaboration with Design School Kolding. The course is headed by Simona Maschi, and its board and faculty include people such as Gillian Crampton-Smith and Bill Verplank.

The business side of CIID undertakes consultancy and research in the fields of education, interaction design, product design and service design for global clients.

Today, CIID offers both summer school courses and its yearlong graduate programme from a location in San Jose, Costa Rica.

References

External links
 Official Site
 Treehugger article about a CIID student project 'Meet the Food You Eat'

Education in Copenhagen
Design schools